The ruins of Waldeck Castle are in the Upper Palatinate region of the state of Bavaria in Germany, on a hill overlooking the village of Waldeck, near Kemnath.

History
The castle in Waldeck was first built in the 12th century by Gebhardus der Waldegge the Landgrave of Leuchtenberg.

References

Ruined castles in Germany
Castles in Bavaria